Protestantism has had a very minor impact on Spanish life since the Reformation of the 16th century, owing to the intolerance of the Spanish government towards any non-Catholic religion and the Spanish Inquisition. However, it has become more prevalent in the 20th and 21st centuries thanks to immigration of Pentecostal Christians from sub-Saharan Africa and Latin America/Caribbean. Many Romani people also converted to Pentecostalism in the last decades. Ninety-two percent of Spain's 8,131 villages do not have an evangelical Protestant church.

Recent history

Francoist persecution
Protestantism made a comeback following the Glorious Revolution of 1868, which resulted in the granting of greater religious liberties; this was rescinded again during caudillo Francisco Franco's Spanish State.

In Franco's authoritarian Spanish State, Protestantism was deliberately marginalised and persecuted. During the Civil War, the rebel forces persecuted the country's 30,000 Protestants, and forced many pastors to leave the country. Once authoritarian rule was established, non-Catholic translations of the Bible were confiscated by the police and Protestant schools were closed. Although the 1945 Spanish Bill of Rights granted freedom of private worship, Protestants suffered legal discrimination and non-Catholic religious services were forbidden in public, to the extent that they could not be in buildings which had exterior signs indicating it was a house of worship and that public activities were prohibited. While the Catholic Church was declared official and enjoyed a close relation to the state, ethnically Basque clergymen harboured nationalist ideas opposed to Spanish centralism and were persecuted and imprisoned in a "Concordat jail" reserved for criminal clergy.

Present status

At present, the Spanish government observes the 1978 Constitution of Spain and the Law of Religious Freedom of 1980, thus guaranteeing many religious liberties to minorities. As of 2009, there are at least 1.5 million Protestants residing in Spain.

In 2018, figures released by the national Observatory of Religious Pluralism show there were 4,238 evangelical and Pentecostal/Adventist places of worship in December 2018, a rise of 197 on the previous year. it was also reported that Spain's Pentecostals topped 4,000 congregations, Pentecostals also opened 16 churches every month.

Significant denominations and groups include:
Spanish Evangelical Church
Spanish Reformed Episcopal Church - an extra-provincial church of the Anglican Communion
Union of Evangelical Baptists of Spain
Reformed Churches in Spain

There are also a number of accredited seminaries in the country. These include:
The Bible Institute and Faculty of Theology of Spain (IBSTE) en Castelldefels, Barcelona.
The United Evangelical Theological Seminary in Madrid (SEUT)
The Protestant Faculty of Theology at Madrid (UEBE)
The Assemblies of God Faculty of Theology in Barcelona

See also
 Christianity in Spain
 Anglicanism in Spain
 Catholic Church in Spain
 Eastern Orthodoxy in Spain
 Evangelical Presbyterian Church in Spain
 Federation of Evangelical Religious Entities of Spain
 Conference of Protestant Churches in Latin Countries of Europe

References

 
Spain
Spain